Route 59 station is a Metra station along the BNSF Line on the border of Aurora, Illinois and Naperville, Illinois. As of 2018, Route 59 is the busiest of Metra's 236 non-downtown stations, with an average of 6,339 weekday boardings.

Bus connections
Pace

 559  Illinois Route 59

Greyhound Lines
 Chicago–Davenport, Iowa

References

External links

Station from Google Maps Street View

Metra stations in Illinois
Transportation in Naperville, Illinois
Buildings and structures in Naperville, Illinois
Railway stations in the United States opened in 1989